Opisidae is a family of crustaceans belonging to the order Amphipoda.

Genera:
 Normanion Bonnier, 1893
 Opisa Boeck, 1876
 Podoprionell Sars, 1895
 Podoprionides Walker, 1906

References

Amphipoda